Wolcott Historic District may refer to:

Wolcott Green Historic District, Wolcott, Connecticut, listed on the National Register of Historic Places (NRHP)
Wolcott Square Historic District, Wolcott, New York, NRHP-listed
South Wolcott Street Historic District, Casper, Wyoming, NRHP-listed

See also
Wolcott House (disambiguation)